R v Morris; Anderton v Burnside [1984] are English highest court conjoined appeal decisions as to the extent of appropriation that can be considered criminal (as the law of theft is codified in the Theft Act 1968).

R v Morris was a final appeal from the Court of Appeal; Anderton v Burnside a leapfrog final appeal from the Divisional Court (the usual first appellate court from the Magistrates if a point of law is in question).

Agreeing with Lord Roskill, per curiam (formulating the decision of the whole court), the Law Lords established that in the English law of theft, an appropriation is established if the defendant clearly assumes a right of the owner, that is the prosecution proves such assumption beyond a reasonable doubt.

Facts

R v Morris
On 30 October 1981 Morris took goods from the shelves of a supermarket. He replaced the price labels attached to them with labels showing a lesser price than the originals. At the checkout he was asked for and paid those lesser prices. He was then arrested.

Anderton v Burnside
Burnside was seen to remove a price label £2.73 from a joint of pork and attached it to another (at £6.91). The checkout was notified and did not allow him to leave the store. He was then arrested.

Grounds for appeal

Both cases
If a person has substituted on an item of goods displayed in a self-service store a price label showing a lesser price for one showing a greater price, with the intention of paying the lesser price and then pays the lesser price at the till and takes the goods, is there at any stage a 'dishonest appropriation' for the purposes of Section 1 of the Theft Act 1968 and if so, at what point does such appropriation take place.

Judgment
Lord Roskill in rejecting the defence team's argument, supported by division between "distinguished academic lawyers" said:

"…the later words "any later assumption of a right" in subsection (1) and the words in subsection (2) "no later assumption by him of rights" seem to me to militate strongly against the correctness of the submission. Moreover the provisions of section 2(1)(a) also seem to point in the same direction. It follows therefore that it is enough for the prosecution if they have proved in these cases the assumption by the defendants of any of the rights of the owner of the goods in question…"

References

Morris
House of Lords cases
1983 in case law
1983 in British law